Mastanabal (Numidian: MSTNB) was one of three legitimate sons of Masinissa, the King of Numidia, a Berber kingdom in, present day Algeria, North Africa. The three brothers were appointed by Scipio Aemilianus Africanus to rule Numidia after Masinissa's death.

His name in Numidian was written as "MSTNB" which Salem Chaker gave its possible reconstruction as "Amastan (a)B(a)", which could mean "defender/protector (a)b(a)".

References

2nd-century BC rulers in Africa
2nd-century BC Berber people
Foreign relations of ancient Rome
Kings of Numidia
Year of birth unknown